Thackwell is a surname. Notable people with the surname include:

Albertine Thackwell (1863-1944), British archer 
Joseph Thackwell (1781–1858), lieutenant general in the British Army
Lisa Thackwell (born 1964/65), New Zealand racing driver
Mike Thackwell (born 1961), New Zealand Formula 1 driver